"Indigo" (stylized as IndiGO) is a song by South Korean rappers Justhis, Kid Milli, Noel, and Yang Hong-won. It was released on June 24, 2018, by Indigo Music as the lead single of the compilation album IM. It won hip-hop track of the year and collaboration of the year at the Korean Hip-hop Awards.

Music and lyrics 
Kid Milli's lyrics in "I mean High School Rapper had really good songs / But who wrote the lyrics to those songs? / Maybe maybe / I won't say" was thought to be a diss to Vinxen, who allegedly copied his lyrics.

Critical Reception 
"Indigo" won hip-hop track of the year and collaboration of the year at the Korean Hip-hop Awards. According to KHA, it "shows who the next generation of Korean hip-hop is."

Charts

Remix 
"Indigo Remix" (stylized as "IndiGO Remix") is the remix of "Indigo" by South Korean rappers Giriboy, The Quiett, Mommy Son, and Swings. It was released on December 12, 2018, by Indigo Music.

References 

2018 songs
Korean-language songs
Korean Hip-hop Award-winning songs